Truman Murray Bodden, OBE (born 22 April 1945) is a former Caymanian politician. An attorney at law by profession, he served as Leader of Government Business from April 1995 to November 2000. He was a member of the Legislative Assembly for George Town. When in government he served in the Ministries of Education, Youth, Finance, Civil Aviation, Employment, Tourism, Environment, Investment and Commerce.

He is a founding member and director of Truman Bodden and Company Attorneys-at-Law, Cayman Islands.

Bodden is the father of two children.

References

1945 births
Living people
Leaders of Government Business of the Cayman Islands
Caymanian lawyers
Officers of the Order of the British Empire
Aviation ministers of the Cayman Islands
Education ministers of the Cayman Islands
Environment ministers of the Cayman Islands
Finance ministers of the Cayman Islands
Tourism ministers of the Cayman Islands
Trade ministers of the Cayman Islands
Youth ministers of the Cayman Islands